Union Township is one of eleven townships in Benton County, Indiana. As of the 2020 census, its population was 283 and it contained 92 housing units. The township was organized in June 1864 and named by John W. Nutt "because of the loyalty shown in furnishing soldiers for the Union army."

Geography

Unincorporated towns
 Lochiel
 Wadena

Adjacent townships
 Center (south)
 Gilboa (east)
 Pine (southeast)
 Richland (west)
 Carpenter Township, Jasper County (northeast)
 Grant Township, Newton County (northwest)

Major highways
  Indiana State Road 55

References

Citations

Sources
 United States Census Bureau cartographic boundary files
 U.S. Board on Geographic Names

External links

 Indiana Township Association
 United Township Association of Indiana

Townships in Benton County, Indiana
Lafayette metropolitan area, Indiana
Townships in Indiana
1864 establishments in Indiana